Tuğçe Canıtez (born 10 November 1990) is a Turkish female professional basketball player for Galatasaray.

Early years
She played for North Idaho College before she transferred to Westmont College.

Club career

Fenerbahçe
Canitez played for Fenerbahçe between 2013 and 2022.

Hatay Büyükşehir Belediyespor
She signed a 1-year contract with Hatay Büyükşehir Belediyespor on 7 July 2022.

Galatasaray
On 28 November 2022, she signed with Galatasaray of the Turkish Women's Basketball Super League (TKBL).

International career
Canıtez debuted for the Turkey women's national basketball team at the preparation matches before she played at the 2012 FIBA World Olympic Qualifying Tournament for Women.  She competed for Turkey at the 2012 and 2016 Summer Olympics.

Honors
2010 second "Best Rebounder" FIBA Europe Under-20 Championship for Women
2012 "NAIA Player of the Year"
2020 Turkish Cup MVP

Club
 5x Turkish Women's Basketball League champion (2016, 2018, 2019, 2021, 2022)
 4x Turkish Women's Basketball Cup champion (2015, 2016, 2019, 2020)
 4x Turkish Women's Basketball Presidential Cup champion (2013, 2014, 2015, 2019)

References

External links

1990 births
Living people
Basketball players at the 2012 Summer Olympics
Basketball players at the 2016 Summer Olympics
Fenerbahçe women's basketball players
Olympic basketball players of Turkey
People from Konak
Small forwards
Sportspeople from İzmir
Turkish expatriate basketball people in the United States
Turkish women's basketball players
Hatay Büyükşehir Belediyesi (women's basketball) players
Galatasaray S.K. (women's basketball) players